Werner E. Ablaß (born 11 December 1946) is a German politician who was a Christian oppositionist in East Germany (GDR). Together with minister Rainer Eppelmann, Secretary of State in the Ministerium für Abrüstung und Verteidigung (MfAuV), Ablaß played a major role in the closure of the National People's Army (NVA) during the German reunification.

History 
Ablaß was born on 11 December 1946, the son of a carpenter in Briesen. He was brought up as a Christian. From 1953 to 1963 he attended the Polytechnic Secondary School in Briesen. He then worked for five years as a carer in a diaconal institution in Züssow. From 1969 to 1972 he was active as a bookseller in Potsdam, then he worked at the GDR state insurance. Ablaß was removed from the office in 1985, as he made a relocation request to West Germany, but which he later cancelled. Then he worked two years long as a cleaner in the church advanced seminar in Hermannswerder, before he was again hired by the state insurance in early 1987. From 1987 to early 1990 he headed a Protestant retirement home in Camin, Mecklenburg.

Ablaß was the co-founder of the party Democratic Awakening in Mecklenburg and in  April 1990 he became Deputy to the Minister and State Secretary in the Ministerium für Abrüstung und Verteidigung (Ministry for disarmament and defense)of the GDR. He served there as a negotiator for the Einigungsvertrag (Unification Treaty)and was involved in the negotiations on the withdrawal of the GDR from the Warsaw Pact. From October 1990 to December 1996 he headed the branch office of the Federal Ministry of Defence in Strausberg. Since 1997 Ablaß has been an appointee for specific function in the field of the Bundeswehr in the "new federal states" (former East Germany). In 1997 he was awarded the Bundesverdienstkreuz.

References

Further reading
 (In German) Werner E. Ablaß: Zapfenstreich. Von der NVA zur Bundeswehr. Kommunalverlag, Düsseldorf 1992, 
 (In German) Hans Ehlert: Armee ohne Zukunft. Das Ende der NVA und die deutsche Einheit. Ch. Links-Verlag, Berlin 2002, .
 (In German) Ehrhart Neubert: Geschichte der Opposition in der DDR 1949–1989. Bundeszentrale für politische Bildung, Schriftenreihe volume 346, Bonn 1997, .

External links 
Werner E. Ablaß on Wer war wer in der DDR?

1946 births
Living people
Recipients of the Cross of the Order of Merit of the Federal Republic of Germany
German politicians
German Protestants